Adam Mada, known professionally as The Wizard of Oz, is an Australian magician, entertainer, magic/illusion designer & director, speaker and magic consultant. He is the magic and illusion consultant, coach and director for the National Institute Of Dramatic Art (N.I.D.A) The magic coach and consultant for Australia's Got Talent 2022 The Australian magic & Illusion associate for Harry Potter and the Cursed Child Parts 1 & 2, the Magic/Illusion designer & director for Possum Magic and Sydney Theatre Companies 2022 version of Blithe Spirit.  He is the resident magician for Studio 3 (TV series) on ABC3, and the famed weekly live cabaret El Circo (41 oxford st darlinghurst nsw 2000) in Sydney Australia, he was the inspiration for 2 characters in the Novel Siren by Tara Moss, Adam was cast in Band of Magicians, supergroup in 2015.

Early life 

Mada became interested in magic in his youth performing for family, friends and private functions before deciding to pursue magic full-time when he was 21. He attended the Jeff McBride Magic Masterclass in Las Vegas, USA with Eugene Burger and has studied conjuring theory with mentors from South Africa, Venezuela, France, Singapore and Australia. Mada is a scholar of magic interested in the social dynamics of performance magic, often advising academics and artists on magic theory and practice

Magic/Illusion Consulting, Design & Direction 
 National Institute of Dramatic Art (N.I.D.A) Appointed Magic and Illusion Tutor and director, 2019.
 Harry Potter and the Cursed Child Australian Magic & Illusion associate, currently playing in Melbourne.
 Possum Magic Magic and Illusion designer and director for the 2019 stage adaptation of Mem Fox's Australian classic.

Fooling David Copperfield 
2016 - Australian radio station 2Day FM invited Adam to create a special trick that could be taught to Hit 30 radio personality Angus O'laughlin who then performed to David Copperfield (illusionist) successfully fooling him back stage in the Copperfield theatre.

Live Performance / Tours 
2016 - Mada along with his proteges Lucas Itrawan and Ash Hodgkinson (Cardistry) were invited to perform at the Royal Bombay Yacht Club to celebrate the life of India's famous radio broadcaster the late Hamid Sayani brother of Ameen Sayani. Mada's show Mada's Marvels toured India funded by The Australian High Commission, The Australia India Council and Mumbai Lit Fest.  Author and researcher John Zubrzycki toured with Mada's Marvels, presenting a lecture on the Australian - Indian connection through conjuring and magic as part of the performance.

Adam produced the first ever Short and Sweet (festival) Magic and Comedy festival in 2016. 2014 Junior Australian Magic Champions "CARDISTRY" also coached and created by Adam Mada took out the Judges and Peoples vote.

In 2015 Adam was cast in the second version of the production Band of Magicians, joining James Galea, Ben Hanlin and Brett Loudermilk.  Previous magicians included Justin Willman, Justin Flom and Nate Staniforth.

Mada was invited to headline the 2014 Hoopla festival with his Mada's Marvels show in Darling Harbour. He is a founding artist of the long running El Circo Cabaret show running weekly at Sydney cabaret venue Slide now in its 7th year. He has also maintained long residencies at Sydney nightspots De Nom, IVY, Tharens, The Chamber of Secrets and is magician in residence at experimental cabaret show El Circo. Mada has written, directed and performed a number of stage shows including "Mada vs. Vegas – the Duelling Magicians" at the Melbourne Magic Festival and Adelaide Fringe., He has also toured with Australian variety productions, most recently playing the character Two-Face in "The Batman Follies of 1929.", is a Headline act for the 2013 national Gangsters ball tour., Mada is playing the character Rasputin in Slides 2013 production of El circo Blanc.

Television 

Mada is the current resident magician on Studio 3 for ABC 3 television Australia.

Adam starred in the Network Ten 2014 Christmas special on Studio 10 with his famous magic drink routine.

Mada appeared alongside magicians Nicholas J. Johnson and Clare Werbeloff in the 2010 series The Real Hustle for Channel 9. He consulted on Sleeping Beauty, creating an illusion for the film's opening sequence. In "Binge", an episode of ABC Television documentary Whatever! The Science of Teens, he worked with Neuroscientist John Currie Prof. John Currie to illustrate the effects of binge drinking in teenagers by applying magic techniques to memory tests. During the 2012 season of reality television competition Australia's Got Talent, Mada collaborated with choreographer Sarah Boulter on a levitation routine for her dance group Ev & Bow.

Speaking

In 2013 Journalist Joe Hildebrand invited Mada to speak about invisibility on a panel at the Museum of Contemporary Art Australia including other speakers Brian Schmidt and Ron McCallum.

Radio 

Mada hosted weekly radio segment 'Wonder Thunder' for FBi radio station in 2009, presenting the history of magic and performing effects live on air.

Fiction 

Mada has collaborated with author Tara Moss, for her crime thriller Siren.

Charity Work

Mada has contributed to several charity organisations with performances, workshops and fund raising. Notably Mada headlined the World Aids Day Gala in 2013, for the Aids Trust of Australia in 2012 Adam was WWF Earth Hour ambassador, prompting criticism from journalist Andrew Bolt In 2013 Mada became an ambassador for the Starlight Children's Foundation He is a coach for the starlight captains as well as raising funds form his public shows as part of the Melbourne Magic Festival Mada's Marvels

Collaborations 

Off stage, Mada has sought to broaden the appeal for magic in Australia through collaborations on film, television, radio, and literature. He has spoken publicly about the need for better support for small business, especially in the arts and entertainment sector.

In 2012, Mada worked with choreographer Farhan Hassan and costume designer Glenna Ng to create 'The Chamber of Secrets Magic Show' at the National Drama Center in Singapore.

Other Collaborations 

 2012: Character in Carol Barroso's short film "The Diamond Sea". 
 2012: Special guest for the Alex Davies mixed reality installation.
 2011: Guest lecturer for the Creative Accounting series at the University of Technology Sydney Gallery. 
 2009: Subject of contemporary artist's Kathryn Grays work "Contingency Plan".

References

External links 
 Official Website
 Twitter
 Facebook

Living people
Australian magicians
Australian artists
People from Sydney
1979 births